The list of Victorian Legislative Council by-elections includes every by-election held in the Australian state of Victoria for the Legislative Council. Prior to the Constitution (Parliamentary Reform) Act 2003 which came into force at the 2006 election, it was necessary for a by-election to be held to fill any vacancy; they have since been filled by an appointment by a joint sitting of the Parliament of Victoria.

List of Legislative Council by-elections

See also
 List of Victorian state by-elections

External links
Psephos: Adam Carr's Election Archive

Victoria

By-elections